Oued el Maleh, Oued el Malah, Wadi el Maleh, etc. is a wadi in Aïn Témouchent Province, Algeria. The name literally means "Salty Wadi". It was known in the past in Spanish as Rio Salado or "Salty River". 

Oued el Maleh is in the northwest part of Algeria and drains into the Mediterranean Sea at about  within Terga Municipality. The climate is semi-arid Mediterranean.

References

Maleh
Geography of Aïn Témouchent Province